Khalifeh Mahalleh (also Romanized as Khalīfeh Maḩalleh) is a village in Chini Jan Rural District, in the Central District of Rudsar County, Gilan Province, Iran. At the 2006 census, its population was 290, in 106 families.  
Davoud Khani (is a Persian poet from this village.

References 

Populated places in Rudsar County